Billy is a given name and a common nickname for William. Notable people with the name include:

 Billy the Kid (1859–1881), American Old West gunfighter born Henry McCarty, also known as William H. Bonney
 Billy Baldwin (decorator) (1903–1983), American interior decorator
 Billy Baldwin (baseball) (1951–2011), American Major League Baseball outfielder
 Billy Barnes (disambiguation)
 Billy Barty (1924–2000), American actor
 Billy Bevan (1887–1957), Australian actor
 Billy Bland (1932–2017), American R&B singer and songwriter
 Billy Boyd (disambiguation)
 Billy Blue (c. 1767–1834), African-American convict transported to Australia
 Billy Brewer (footballer) (died 1914), English professional footballer
 Billy Brown (disambiguation)
 Billy Burke (disambiguation)
 Billy Butler (singer) (1945–2015), American soul singer and songwriter
 Billy Connolly (born 1942), Scottish comedian
 Billy Corgan (born 1967), American musician, frontman of Smashing Pumpkins
 Billy Crawford (born 1982), Filipino-American actor and television personality
 Billy Crook (English footballer) (1926–2011)
 Billy Crook (American soccer) (born 1964)
 Billy Crystal (born 1948), American actor
 Billy Davis (disambiguation)
 Billy De Wolfe (1907–1974), American actor
 Billy Eppler (born 1975), American baseball executive
 Billy Fox (politician) (1939–1974), Irish politician
 Billy Fox (boxer) (1926–1986), American light-heavyweight boxer
 Billy Forbes (Scottish footballer) (fl. 1911–1926)
 Billy Forbes (footballer, born 1990), Turks and Caicos Islands footballer
 Billy Gallagher (chef) (1948–2016), South African chef and businessman
 Billy Gibbons (born 1949), American musician
 Billy Graham (1918–2018), American evangelist
 Billy Hahn (born 1953), American basketball coach
 Billy Howard, English comedian
 Billy Howard (gridiron football) (born 1950), American football player
 Billy Howerdel (born 1970), American musician, founding member of A Perfect Circle, frontman of ASHES dIVIDE
 Billy Herrington (1969–2018), American actor
 Billy Idol (born 1955), English rock musician
 Billy Joel (born 1949), American musician
 Billy Johnson (disambiguation)
 Billy Jones (disambiguation)
 Billy Knight (born 1952), American basketball player and executive
 Billy Knight (basketball, born 1979) (1979–2018), American basketball player
 Billy Knight (tennis) (born 1935), British tennis player
 Billy Magnussen (born 1985), American actor
 Billy Martin (1928–1989), American baseball player and manager
 Billy Masters (columnist) (born 1969), American gossip columnist
 Billy Masters (American football) (born 1944), former American Football League and National Football League player
 Billy Rush Masters (1950–1981), American composer and rock guitarist
 Billy Mays (1958–2009), American television salesperson
 Billy Mays (footballer) (1902–1959), Welsh footballer
 Billy McShepard (born 1987), American basketball player in the Israeli National League
 Billy Meier (born 1937),  claims to be in regular contact with extraterrestrial beings
 Billy Mitchell (gamer) (born 1965), American gamer and restaurateur 
 Billy Monahan (born 2008)
 Billy Murray (disambiguation)
 Billy Name (1940–2016), American lighting designer
 Billy Ouattara (born 1992), Ghanaian/French basketball player
 Billy Parker (disambiguation)
 Billy Parks (1948–2009), American football player
 Billy Payne (born 1947), American golf administrator
 Billy Price (actor) (born 2000), English actor
 Billy Price (American football) (born 1995), American football player
 Billy Reid (fashion designer)
 Billy Joe Royal (1942–2015), American singer
 Billy Sharp (born 1986), English footballer
 Billy Sheehan (born 1953), American bass player
 Billy (slave), an African-American slave accused of treason
 Billy Smart Jr. (1934–2005), British circus performer and impresario
 Billy Snedden (1926–1987), Australian politician
 Billy Tauzin (born 1943), American lobbyist and politician
 Billy Taylor (disambiguation)
 Billy Unger (born 1995), American actor
 Billy Wade (cricketer) (1914–2003), South African cricketer
 Billy Wade (racing driver) (1930–1965), American race car driver
 Billy West (born 1952), American voice actor
 Billy Walker (disambiguation)
 Billy Williams (disambiguation)
 Billy Wright (disambiguation)
 Billy Zane (born 1966), American actor
 Reverend Billy, of Reverend Billy and the Church of Stop Shopping, New York City-based performance group

Fictional
 the title character of Billy Elliot, a film about a boy aspiring to be a ballet dancer
 Billy Coen, a character in Resident Evil Zero
 Billy Cranston, the original Blue Ranger from the Power Rangers TV series
 Billy Dilley, the title character of the animated TV series Billy Dilley's Super-Duper Subterranean Summer
 Billy Flynn (Chicago), a lawyer from the play Chicago and its adaptations
 Billy Grant, a character in 1993 action/martial arts movie Showdown
 Billy Hargrove, a character on Stranger Things
 Billy Hitchcock, a character from the Final Destination
 Billy Loomis, a character from the 1996 film Scream
 Billy K, a character in the Canadian TV series Catwalk
 Billy Kane, a Fatal Fury character
 Billy Kessler, a character in the comic book series G.I. Joe: A Real American Hero
 Billy Francis Kopecki, a character in the 1988 American fantasy comedy-drama movie Big
 Billy Lee Black, a character in Xenogears
 Billy Keikeya, aide to President Laura Roslin in the reimagined Battlestar Galactica TV series
 Billy Masterson, a character in the 1997 English-language French science fiction action movie The Fifth Element
 the title character of Billy Budd, a novella by Herman Melville
 Billy Nolan, a major antagonist in Stephen King's Carrie
 Billy Peltzer, a character in the 1984 and 1990 American comedy horror film Gremlins and Gremlins 2: The New Batch
 Billy Pilgrim, protagonist in Kurt Vonnegut's Slaughterhouse Five
 Billy Quinn, a character in the 1989 American-Canadian fantasy drama movie Prancer
 Billy Tate, a character in TV series Soap
 Billy Thunderman, from the tv series, The Thundermans
 Billy Twofeathers, a Native American character on Shining Time Station
 Billy Whizz, a character in the UK comic The Beano
 Billy Williams (Coronation Street), fictional character on the British soap opera Coronation Street
 Billy (Billy and Mandy), a character on The Grim Adventures of Billy and Mandy
 Billy, a character in Adventure Time
 Billy, the title character of Sport Billy, a TV cartoon show

See also
 Billie (disambiguation)
 Billy (disambiguation)
 Bertrand de Billy (born 1965), French conductor
 Jacques de Billy (1602–1679), French Jesuit mathematician
 Jacques de Billy (abbot) (1535–1581), French patristic scholar, theologian, jurist, linguist and Benedictine abbot

English-language masculine given names
Hypocorisms
English masculine given names